Austin Hack (born May 17, 1992 in Springfield, Massachusetts) is an American rower. He grew up in Old Lyme, Connecticut. He competed in the men's eight event at the 2016 Summer Olympics. He rowed for Stanford University under coach Craig Amerkhanian, graduating in 2014 with a B.A. in Political Science.

In June 2021, he qualified to represent the United States at the 2020 Summer Olympics.

References

External links
 

1992 births
Living people
American male rowers
Olympic rowers of the United States
Rowers at the 2016 Summer Olympics
Rowers at the 2020 Summer Olympics
World Rowing Championships medalists for the United States
Sportspeople from Massachusetts
Stanford Cardinal athletes
Sportspeople from Springfield, Massachusetts